Geeta is the fifteenth studio album by jazz saxophonist and flutist Charles Lloyd. It was released by A&M Records as album SP 3046.

Reception 
Billboards 1973 review commented that "The fading Indian musical influence blending cogently with free flowing modern jazz is the end result here", and suggested that the second side was the more commercial.

 Track listing 
All compositions by Charles Lloyd except as indicated
 Side A "Geeta Suite" – 13:30
 "Arjuna (Tender Warrior)"
 "Song of Brindavan"
 "Dance of the Gopis" – 6:25
 Side B'
 "Stones Medley" (Mick Jagger, Keith Richards) – 11:08
 "Backstreet Girl"
 "Lady Jane"
 "Mother's Little Helper"
 "Maxfield" – 4:30
 "Jungle Blues" – 2:12
 "Berries" – 2:02

Sources:

Personnel 
 Charles Lloyd – flute, tenor saxophone
 DeWayne "Blackbird" McKnight – guitar
 Baba Alade – bass
 Aashish Khan, Planish Khan – dholak

Production
 Art direction – Roland Young
 Cover art – Masami Teraoka
 Album design – Chuck Beeson

Source:

References 

Charles Lloyd (jazz musician) albums
1973 albums
A&M Records albums